The former Sanford High School, also known as West Sanford Middle School, is a historic high school building located at Sanford, Lee County, North Carolina. It was designed by the firm of Wilson, Berryman & Kennedy and built in 1924–1925.  It is a two-story, "L"-shaped, Classical Revival style brick building.  The front facade features a slightly projecting center pavilion and terminal pavilions with concrete-faced pilasters with enriched capitals. The building houses the Lee County Art and Community Center.

It was listed on the National Register of Historic Places in 1995.  It is located in the Hawkins Avenue Historic District.

References

School buildings on the National Register of Historic Places in North Carolina
Neoclassical architecture in North Carolina
School buildings completed in 1925
Buildings and structures in Lee County, North Carolina
National Register of Historic Places in Lee County, North Carolina
Historic district contributing properties in North Carolina
1925 establishments in North Carolina